This is a list of some notable Luo Kenyans, an ethnic group and nation associated with Kenya, living or dead. Some persons may not be listed here, but are listed in other related articles, shown under the See also section. 

This is a list of people of Luo Descent and for those otherwise perceived as Luos; either in birth or adoption. Only those meeting notability criteria  as shown by having an article here, are included, unless their position makes it obvious that they are unquestionably qualified for one.    

This list is incomplete; you can help by  expanding it.

Actors
 Lupita Nyong'o, Oscar Award winning actress and filmmaker;  (Kenyan/Mexican)
Irene Ayimba
Sidede Onyulo

Entrepreneurs
Ida Odinga, businesswoman and wife of Raila Odinga.

Models

Gaylyne Ayugi Model

Musicians
 Ayub Ogada, singer, composer, and performer on the nyatiti, 
 Daniel Owino Misiani, Tanzanian musician from Mara Region. 
 Musa Juma, musician (Kenya)
 Okatch Biggy, musician (Kenyan)
Owuor Arunga
Dr. Osito Kalle, Recording Artist
Musa jakadalla [musician Kenya]

Politicians
Achieng Oneko, independence freedom fighter and politician (Kenya)
Anyang' Nyong'o
 Barack Obama, Sr. (American)
 Betty Oyella Bigombe, former Ugandan politician
Dalmas Otieno
 Milton Obote, former Ugandan President
 James Orengo, Senate Member in Kenya  
 Jaramogi Oginga Odinga -   first Vice President of independent Kenya
 Oburu Odinga, former Kenyan Minister and Member of Kenyan Senate
Otieno Kajwang

 Opiyo Oloya  

 Raila Odinga, second Prime Minister of Kenya
Raphael Tuju
 Robert Ouko, Kenyan Foreign Minister, 
 Tom Mboya, politician, Pan-Africanist,  (Kenya)
 Ochola Ogaye Mak'Anyengo, Freedom Fighter, Trade Unionist, Member of Parliament, Assistant Cabinet Minister

Sports people
 Divock Okoth Origi,  Belgian footballer, son of Kenyan footballer Mike Origi. (Belgian)
Congestina Achieng Female boxer
 Dennis Oliech, football player 
 Johnny Oduya, a defenseman for the Chicago Blackhawks ,  NHL
David Ochieng Footballer
David Owino  Footballer
 Dancan Otieno Footballer
 Frank Odhiambo

Think tanks
 Barack Obama Sr., economist, Harvard University graduate, father of previous U.S. President Barack Obama (Kenyan)
 David Wasawo, University of Oxford trained Zoologist,  first African Deputy Principal of Makerere University College and Nairobi University College
 Prof. Henry Odera Oruka - philosopher
 Olara Otunnu
 Tom Mboya

Writers
 Grace Ogot, educationist (Kenya)
 Thomas R. Odhiambo, founder of International Centre of Insect Physiology and Ecology (Kenya)
 Yvonne Adhiambo Owuor, author (Kenya)
Raila Odinga
Miguna Miguna
Tom Mboya
Anyang Nyong'o
 Anthony Omoro Mbai, Writer, Educationist and Historian (Makerere University College)

See also
Kenyans
Kenyan actors

References

Kenyan Luo people
Lists of Kenyan people
Luo people